The 2007–08 Connecticut Huskies men's basketball team represented the University of Connecticut and the Connecticut Huskies men's basketball program in the 2007–08 college basketball season. Coached by Jim Calhoun, they played their home games at the XL Center in Hartford, Connecticut, and Harry A. Gampel Pavilion in Storrs, Connecticut.

The Huskies finished with an overall record of 24–9, including a Big East Conference record of 13–5. The team finished the regular season in 4th place in the Big East standings.

Recruiting class

Roster
Listed are the student athletes who are members of the 2008–2009 team.

Schedule

|-
!colspan=10| Exhibition

|-
!colspan=10| Regular season

|-
!colspan=10| Big East tournament

|-
!colspan=10| 2008 NCAA Division I men's basketball tournament

References

UConn Huskies men's basketball seasons
Connecticut Huskies
Connecticut
2007 in sports in Connecticut
2008 in sports in Connecticut